Sardar Raja College of Engineering (SRCE) is an engineering college located in Alangulam, Tamil Nadu, India. It is affiliated with Anna University.

SRCE was established in 2000 under the chairmanship of philanthropist Dr. S.A. Raja.

Courses offered

Undergraduate
 B.E. Civil Engineering
 B.E. Computer Science and Engineering
 B.E. Electronics and Communication Engineering
 B.E. Electrical and Electronics Engineering
 B.E. Mechanical Engineering

Postgraduate
 M.E. Applied Electronics
 M.E. Computer Science
 Master of Computer Application (MCA)

References

External links
 Official site
 Rajas Colleges

Engineering colleges in Tamil Nadu
Colleges affiliated to Anna University
Education in Tirunelveli district
Educational institutions established in 2000
2000 establishments in Tamil Nadu